Death Dealer may refer to:

Death Dealer (painting), a 1973 fantasy painting, fictional character and book series created by Frank Frazetta
The Death Dealers, a mystery novel by Isaac Asimov
Death Dealer (Underworld), the vampire warriors from the Underworld film series
Vengeance Is a Dish Served Cold, also known as Death's Dealer, a 1971 Italian Western film
Death Dealer (band), a heavy metal band with ex-Manowar guitarist Ross the Boss
Death Dealers (album), a 2011 album by Adept
The Death Dealer, a paranormal romance novel by Heather Graham Pozzessere
Death Dealer: the Memoirs of the SS Kommandant at Auschwitz, an autobiography by Rudolf Höss
 "Death Dealers", a nickname for the 67th Armored Regiment in the US Army
 Death Dealer, a comic book character in Marvel Comics.